Vikapita Meroro (born 21 November 1981 in Aminuis) is a Namibian professional boxer. He is a light heavyweight boxer and has fought for the WBC Youth World super middleweight title.

Vikapita Meroro began his first fighting experience with professionals. He beat Elijah Kwenaetsile with a points victory.

He encountered Ukrainian Stanislav Kashtanov for the WBC Youth World super middleweight title and lost in Kashtanov's homeland and home city Donetsk, Ukraine.

References

Living people
People from Omaheke Region
Super-middleweight boxers
Light-heavyweight boxers
1981 births
Namibian male boxers